Diadegma aestivale is a wasp first described by Henry Lorenz Viereck in 1921. No subspecies are listed.

References

aestivale
Insects described in 1921